Johan Coetzee may refer to:

 Aranos Coetzee (born 1988), Namibian international rugby union player
 Gert-Johan Coetzee (born 1987), South African fashion designer